The Pearl and Hermes Atoll, also known as Pearl and Hermes Reef, is part of the Northwestern Hawaiian Islands, a group of small islands and atolls that form the farthest northwest portion of the Hawaiian island chain. The atoll consists of a variable number of flat and sandy islets, typically between five and seven. More were noted in historical sources but have since been lost to erosion and rising sea levels.

It has been the site of at least eight known shipwrecks, including the Japanese Wiji Maru, SS Quartette, and most recently the M/V Casitas, which ran aground on the reef in 2005.

The atoll is an important habitat for seabirds, marine life, and invertebrate species. Twenty-two bird species nest and breed on the islands, including twenty percent of the world's population of black-footed albatrosses. The atoll has historically been included with the rest of the Northwestern Hawaiian Islands in conservation efforts. It is included in the Papahānaumokuākea Marine National Monument, created in 2006. Ghost nets and other fishing debris, rising sea levels, and the invasive algae Chondria tumulosa pose a significant risk to the atoll and its wildlife.

Geography

Like the rest of the Hawaiian Islands, the atoll observes Hawaii Standard Time.

The atoll's land area consists of several small islands which are periodically washed over when winter storms pass, along with several ephemeral sand spits. As of 2012, according to the United States Geological Survey (USGS), the atoll consists of five islands. Earlier sources note the presence of other islets, including a Sand Island and a Bird Island. 

From largest to smallest, the five remaining islands are Southeast Island, Seal-Kittery North Island, Grass Island, and Little North Island. Only the three largest islands have vegetation. 

Comma-shaped North Island is the atoll's northernmost island.

Nomenclature

The Hawaiian-language name for the atoll, Holoikauaua, was established in the late 1990s by the Hawaiian Lexicon Committee following an effort to restore traditional Hawaiian names which had been lost, misspelled, or replaced with foreign names. Because its original Hawaiian name was not known, the Committee conferred the new name of Holoikauaua to the atoll, in reference to the Hawaiian monk seal which frequents the waters there.

History

Initial discovery
The atoll was discovered in 1822 when the English whaleships Pearl and Hermes ran aground on the surrounding reefs. The two ships had been en route to Japan from Honolulu through the uncharted waters of the Northwestern Hawaiian Islands. Sometime late in the evening of April 24 or early in the morning of April 25, the 258-ton Hermes ran aground on an unseen reef. Shortly thereafter, the 327-ton Pearl also ran aground when it approached to provide assistance. The combined crews of both ships, some 57 sailors, were marooned on an unspecified island nearby for several months. During that time, James Robinson, a carpenter's mate, directed the construction of a small 30-ton vessel from the wreckage. Some accounts provide the name of the vessel as Drift, while others state it was called Deliverance.

On July 1, before the beach-built vessel could be launched, the passing ship Earl of Morby was sighted. 46 of the sailors took passage on the Earl of Morby, but Robinson and eleven others opted to purchase the vessel they had built and sail it back to Honolulu in the hopes of recovering some of the losses incurred by the wreck. The sailors managed to sail the small vessel back to the main Hawaiian islands without further loss of life. They sold it for $2,000 USD. Robinson remained in Honolulu, and founded the James Robinson and Company shipyard there in 1827.

King Kamehameha III of Hawaii claimed the atoll by proclamation in 1854. In 1857, it was surveyed by the crew of the Hawaiian schooner Manuokawai. The United States took possession of the atoll in 1859 by way of Captain N.C. Brooks and his ship Gambia. Brooks reported that the atoll had eleven or twelve islets, and that some of them had trees and coarse grass. In 1867, the crew of the Laconda produced the first reliable chart of the reef, which was published by the United States Navy.

Entrepreneurs from a rabbit canning business intentionally released rabbits on Southeast Island in 1894, where they devoured all the island's vegetation. This was the first documented instance of mammals being introduced to the atoll.

The Japanese schooner Wiji Maru was wrecked on the atoll in 1904, destroying the ship and its cargo of feathers. There was no loss of life, however. In 1916, crew members from the Thetis reported that they had spotted rabbits and Japanese fishing huts on Southeast Island. In 1923, the vessels of the Tanager Expedition stopped at the atoll and killed "all but one rabbit on Southeast Island."

Exploitation of oysters

In 1927, Captain William Greig Anderson of the Lanikai Fishing Company was fishing for tuna and in the process, discovered beds of black-lip pearl oysters in the atoll. He reported that they were rich with pearls – the only pearl beds in the United States. Anderson formed a trading company to capitalize on his find. Over the next three years, his trading company harvested some 20,000 pearls from the atoll, with the largest of these having a reported value of US$5,000. Some 150 tons of oyster shells, valued for their shiny mother-of-pearl, were harvested in the process. They were primarily sold to button manufacturers on the United States mainland.

In 1929, oyster harvesting in the atoll was made illegal by the government of the Territory of Hawaii. In 1930, the United States Bureau of Fisheries decided to conduct a thorough study of the atoll, led by Dr. Paul Galtsoff. The United States Navy loaned the minesweeper ship Whippoorwill for the five-week expedition, which covered the reef's geography, flora, and invertebrate and fish populations. A specific emphasis was placed on the pearl oyster population. Only 470 oysters were found. 320 were collected alive, and 150 were opened for examination. An estimated 10% contained pearls. Based on those findings, the surveyors concluded that Captain Anderson must have harvested between 150,000-200,000 oysters to obtain his reported 20,000 pearls, which had significantly depleted the oyster beds.

The Whippoorwill expedition documented wildlife aside from the oysters: Dr. Galtsoff's report indicated that they had found seals, sharks, sea turtles, albatrosses, booby birds, and numerous species of fish. They did not find any of the trees which Captain Brooks had mentioned in his 1857 report.

Later wrecks

The ship was driven further onto the reef by rough waves and  winds, which collapsed the forward bow and damaged two forward holds. The crew was evacuated by the SS Frontenac Victory the following day. The salvage tug Ono arrived on December 25 to attempt to tow the ship clear, but persistent stormy weather forced a delay of the rescue attempt. On January 3, before another rescue attempt could be made, the ship's anchors tore loose and the Quartette was blown onto the reef. It was deemed a total loss. Several weeks later, it snapped in half at the keel and the two pieces sank. The wreck site now serves as an artificial reef which provides a habitat for many fish species.

On July 2, 2005, the  research vessel M/V Casitas, chartered by the National Oceanic and Atmospheric Administration (NOAA), ran aground on the north end of the atoll. The ship was carrying large quantities of gasoline, diesel fuel, and oil, which posed a substantial risk of leaking. Leak-prevention and extraction efforts led by the United States Coast Guard (USCG) in conjunction with other United States Government and State of Hawaii agencies began immediately. Although several people on board were forced to evacuate the ship, there was no loss of life. The initial grounding, combined with the rescue efforts, caused extensive damage to the reef including "breakage of coral heads, scouring of the substrate, and injury to the reef structure itself". The ship was fully removed from the atoll on August 4, 2005, but was too damaged for salvage. Efforts to remove remaining debris and repair the reef began in 2011.

Site exploration

In 2004, divers from NOAA located wreckage believed to be from the Pearl during a debris removal dive. They were not able to complete a full survey at the time due to the challenging site environment. The same dive team also located the wreck site of an unknown fishing vessel during the same trip, which they nicknamed the "Oshima" site as some of the components located were similar to the Japanese "Oshima" design. Among the components located were "a six-cylinder Atlas Imperial diesel and machinery scatter, propeller shaft and propeller, a marine propulsion plant popular in the early decades of the 20th century." Researchers theorized that the wreckage was an East Asian fishing vessel that struck the reef sometime after 1918, based on the age of the components.

Maritime archaeologists from the NOAA returned to the wreck site of the Pearl in 2005 and 2006 to conduct further surveys. The 2005 survey was based on the NOAA research vessel Hiʻialakai. The same group also attempted to survey the nearby site of the Hermes, but were prevented by poor weather conditions. A number of artifacts were found at the Pearl site, including anchors, two cannons, and large try pots for rendering whale blubber. Many smaller artifacts were found actually embedded into the coral of the reef. The 2006 survey focused on completing a full site plan of the wreckage. In contrast to the scattered state of the Hermes site, the artifacts of the Pearl site are grouped roughly in the same configuration that they would have had on the intact ship, with site length being approximately the length the ship would have been.

In 2008, NOAA maritime archaeologists returned to the site of the Hermes to complete the survey begun in 2005. A full site plan was completed, and both photographs and high definition video were made. The site contained similar artifacts to those found at the site of the Pearl, including two anchors and four cannons. At least 33 cannonballs were found, stored in linear racks, as well as stores of musket balls. Finally, some 150 iron ballast pieces were found. The extremely scattered state of the wreckage seems to confirm that the Hermes broke apart quickly and scattered with force across the sea floor.

Flora and fauna

Plant life

The islets of the Pearl and Hermes Atoll support thirteen native plant species and seven introduced species, including coastal grasses, vines, and herbal plants. Invasive plant species are considered a major conservation issue on the atoll, as they often out-compete and replace native species. As an example, Setaria verticillata, an undesirable noxious weed, has displaced the native grass Eragrostis variabilis on Southeast Island. An illegal landing by the military in the 1960s brought invasive field mustard seeds from Midway Atoll, which had to be removed by the U.S. Fish and Wildlife Service. The flowering plant Verbesina encelioides has been identified as a major invasive threat since at least 2001. Although it provides food and nesting space for small songbirds, it poses a significant threat of entanglement to native seabirds, so removal is considered a priority for conservation purposes.

Avian life

The Pearl and Hermes Atoll is an important nesting area for many seabirds. Approximately 160,000 birds from 22 different species are known to live and breed on the Atoll. Tristram's storm petrels and black-footed albatrosses are among the most prominent. In 2001, it was reported that twenty percent of the world's population of black-footed albatrosses nested on Pearl and Hermes. Pearl and Hermes also hosts one of two known sites where little terns nest in Hawaii. In addition, the endangered Laysan finch was introduced to the island in 1967 to provide a backup population of these birds, should a hurricane, disease, rat introduction, or other disaster wipe out the population on the island of Laysan.

Invertebrates
The Pearl and Hermes Atoll provides an extensive and unique habitat for invertebrates, including various sponges and thirty-three species of stony corals. Some invasive invertebrate species have been found on the reef, including the orange-striped sea anemone, which is native to Japan, and the Christmas tree hydroid, which competes with native invertebrates for space.

The atoll was once heavily populated with black-lip pearl oysters, but overfishing from 1927–1930 caused the population to crash to only 470 in 1930. An expedition in 1950 turned up only six live oysters, and another in 1969 only found one. Surveys in 1994 and 2000 also found only a few oysters, and a full analysis by the NOAA in 2003 concluded that the population has never recovered to pre-harvesting levels.

Other wildlife

The Pearl and Hermes Atoll supports breeding populations of endangered Hawaiian monk seals and sea turtles. Spinner dolphins are known to mate in the area. According to the U.S. Fish and Wildlife Service, "the atoll has the highest standing stock of fish and the highest number of fish species in the NWHI", including sabre squirrelfish, various eels, Galapagos sharks, Sandbar sharks, giant trevally or ulua, angelfish, āweoweo or Hawaiian bigeyes, parrotfish, and various types of lobsters. Although they are rare in the rest of the Hawaiian Islands, masked angelfish and Japanese angelfish are common in the Pearl and Hermes Atoll.

It was named Prognathodes basabei in honor of diver Pete Basabe, who provided support to the dives that first discovered the species.

Conservation efforts

Because of its small size, Pearl and Hermes Atoll has typically not been singled out for individual environmental protection; historically, it has been bundled with the Northwestern Hawaiian Islands as a protected region. The region was first protected in 1909 when U.S. President Theodore Roosevelt created the Hawaiian Islands Bird Reservation through , which included Pearl and Hermes Atoll. Over the next century, protection of the region increased incrementally, culminating in President George W. Bush signing Proclamation 8031 in 2006, designating the waters of the Northwestern Hawaiian Islands a national monument under the 1906 Antiquities Act.

Threats

Derelict fishing gear (ghost nets) and other types of marine debris have had a major impact on the reefs and associated fauna of the atoll. Pearl and Hermes Atoll is considered a high-risk entanglement zone for monk seals. Efforts have been undertaken to lessen the threat of this growing problem, including attempts at prevention as well as recurring debris removal projects. A multi-agency study was launched in 1999 to remove and catalogue debris from the water surrounding Lisianski Island and Pearl and Hermes Atoll. In 2000, the joint NOAA and NMFS Derelict Fishing Net Removal Project was launched, with the objective of removing fishing debris from the atoll and identifying any non-native species. In 2003,  of marine debris was removed from the Pearl and Hermes reefs. In 2014, a net tangle weighing  was located in the atoll.

Rising sea level is also a major concern for the atoll due to the extremely low elevation of most of the islands. The U.S. Environmental Protection Agency projects that sea level will rise  by the year 2100. The other islets would also lose significant amounts of land area. Estimates of total land area loss range from 15% to 65% in a scenario of median sea-level rise, threatening the habitats of monk seals, sea turtles, and nesting birds.

In 2016, a mysterious new red algae species known as Chondria tumulosa was spotted growing on the reefs. By 2019, it had smothered and killed large amounts of reef on the northeast section of the atoll. Analysis of the species and management techniques will be required to prevent the species from taking over other reefs on the atoll and the rest of the Northwest Hawaiian Islands.

Climate
Like Midway, Pearl and Hermes has a tropical savanna climate (Köppen classification Aw). The atoll has no cold season. Its wet season corresponds to the high-sun months, and its dry season corresponds to the low-sun months.

See also

 Desert island
 Lists of islands

References

External links

 Pearl and Hermes Atoll
 Quick Facts on the Pearl and Hermes Atoll from the PBS Ocean Adventures site
 Pearl and Hermes Atoll: Blocks 1015 thru 1022, Census Tract 114.98, Honolulu County, Hawaii, United States Census Bureau.
 Google Street View images from the Atoll
 	

  	

Pearl and Hermes Atoll
Northwestern Hawaiian Islands
Atolls of Hawaii
Coral reefs of the United States
Reefs of the Pacific Ocean
Hawaiian–Emperor seamount chain
Miocene volcanoes
Paleogene Oceania
Cenozoic Hawaii
Important Bird Areas of Hawaii